Borsigwerke may refer to

 Borsigwerke, a former German company founded by August Borsig
 Borsigwerke (Berlin U-Bahn), a subway station of the Berlin U-Bahn
 Borsig Werke, a pseudonym of Alexander Hacke, musician
 Borsig Lokomotiv Werke (AEG), a locomotive works in Hennigsdorf owned by AEG after the takeover of Borsig AG